American University 12/13/70 is a live album by the Allman Brothers Band.  The first of a series of archival concert recordings from the Allman Brothers Band Recording Company, it features the group's original lineup.  It was released in April 2002.

On December 13, 1970, the band played two concerts at American University in Washington, D.C.  The first five songs on the album are from the late show, and the last two songs are from the early show.

Critical reception 

On AllMusic, William Ruhlmann said, "There is little new here, but the playing is fierce, especially the interaction of Duane Allman and Dickey Betts, and with a solid 20-plus-minute version of "Whipping Post", Allman Brothers Band fans should be pleased with the band's first self-released effort."

Alan Paul wrote in Guitar World, "... the sudden appearance of a virtually unheard Duane-era ABB performance is big news, making it an excellent choice to debut the band's series of sanctioned, self-released archive CDs. It doesn't hurt, of course, that the band's December 13, 1970 performance was top notch."

Track listing
"Statesboro Blues" (Blind Willie McTell) – 4:34
"Trouble No More" (McKinley Morganfield) – 3:49
"Don't Keep Me Wonderin'" (Gregg Allman) – 3:46
"Leave My Blues At Home" (Gregg Allman) – 6:45
"Stormy Monday" (T-Bone Walker) – 5:03
"You Don't Love Me" (Willie Cobbs) – 15:48
"Whipping Post" (Gregg Allman) – 20:40

Personnel 
The Allman Brothers Band
Duane Allman – slide guitar and lead guitar
Gregg Allman – vocals, Hammond B-3 organ
Dickey Betts – lead guitar
Berry Oakley – bass guitar
Jaimoe – drums, percussion
Butch Trucks – drums, tympani
Production
Recording produced by the Allman Brothers Band
Package produced by Kirk West, Bert Holman
Executive producer: Tom Dowd
Live mixing: Mike Callahan
CD Mastering: Vlado Meller
Audio restoration, digital editing: Robb Navrides
Package design: Jeff Faith
Liner notes: Bert Holman

References

2002 live albums
The Allman Brothers Band live albums